The 2008 Volta a Catalunya (88th edition) road cycling race took place from May 19 to May 25, 2008, in Catalonia, Spain. Gustavo César took overall victory, becoming first rider of non-ProTour team to win a ProTour race general classification.

Teams
Twenty-two teams of up to eight riders took part. The following UCI ProTour and UCI Professional Continental teams were named to the 2008 Volta a Catalunya:

Route

Stages

Prologue
May 19, 2008: Lloret de Mar to Lloret de Mar,  (ITT)

Stage 1
May 20, 2008: Riudellots de la Selva to Banyoles,

Stage 2
May 21, 2008: Banyoles to La Seu d'Urgell,

Stage 3
May 22, 2008: La Seu d'Urgell to Ascó "La Vostra Energia",

Stage 4
May 23, 2008: Ascó "La Vostra Energia" to El Vendrell,

Stage 5
May 24, 2008: El Vendrell to Pallejà,

Stage 6
May 25, 2008: Pallejà to Barcelona,

Jersey progress

Jersey wearers when one rider is leading two or more competitions
 On stage 1, George Hincapie wore the points jersey
 On stage 2, Leonardo Duque wore the points jersey

Individual standings
As of 25 May 2008, after the 2008 Volta a Catalunya.

 78 riders have scored at least one point on the 2008 UCI ProTour.

See also
2008 in road cycling

References

External links
  
  
cyclingnews.com

2008
Volta
2008 in Spanish road cycling
2008 UCI ProTour
May 2008 sports events in Europe